The New Hampshire Farm Museum is a farm museum on White Mountain Highway (New Hampshire Route 125) in Milton, New Hampshire, United States.  Three centuries of New Hampshire rural life are presented in the historic farmhouse. The museum includes a  three-story great barn with collection of agricultural machinery, farm tools, sleighs and wagons. There are also live farm animals, a nature trail and a museum shop.  The museum is located on the former Plumer-Jones Farm, a traditional series of connected buildings with farmhouse dating to the late 18th century and barns dating to the mid 19th century, which was listed on the National Register of Historic Places in 1979.

Setting
This land is a subset of land settled in the 1780s by Joseph and Beard Plumer, two of the area's early settlers. The land they worked has been reduced by the construction of the turnpike.

The focal point of the museum is the connected 19th-century farmstead, a series of structures beginning with a small barn near the road, and ending with the Great Barn, one of the largest barns in southeastern New Hampshire. The farmstead includes as one of its intermediate ells the 1782 house of Joseph Plumer, quite possibly one of the first wood-frame structures built in this part of Milton. The main block of the farmstead, located near its center, was built about 1810, and served as a local tavern.

The museum also owns the Plummer Homestead adjacent to the south; it was built by Beard Plumer.

Features
The museum functions as a working demonstration farm.  The Great Barn houses three floors of exhibits of farm implements and machinery.  The main farmhouse and the Plummer farmhouse are open to guided tours; the sections of the Jones house are each decorated in the style of a different era.  Also on the property are a blacksmith's shop, with demonstrations on weekends, and a cider mill barn, which is used as an education venue.  Walking trails wind their way through the wood lots at the back of the property.

Museum history
After its acquisition by the Plumers (later spelled "Plummer") in the 18th century, it was farmed by generations of Joneses and Plummers. It was acquired by the museum as its permanent home in 1979.

See also
Open-air museum
National Register of Historic Places listings in Strafford County, New Hampshire

References

External links 
 New Hampshire Farm Museum website

Farm museums in the United States
Agriculture in New Hampshire
Historic house museums in New Hampshire
Museums in Strafford County, New Hampshire
Farms on the National Register of Historic Places in New Hampshire
National Register of Historic Places in Strafford County, New Hampshire
Milton, New Hampshire